Theodore George Soderberg (January 8, 1923 – November 15, 2012) was an American sound engineer. He was nominated for five Academy Awards in the category Sound Recording.

Selected filmography
 Patton (1970)
 Vanishing Point (1971)
 The French Connection (1971)
 The Poseidon Adventure (1972)
 Harry and Tonto (1974)
 The Towering Inferno (1975)
 The Other Side of Midnight (1977)
 The Turning Point (1977)
 The Rose (1979)
 Revenge of the Nerds (1984)

References

External links

1923 births
2012 deaths
American audio engineers